The 2022 Sparta Prague Open was a professional tennis tournament played on clay courts. It was part of the 2022 ATP Challenger Tour. It took place in Prague, Czech Republic between 18 and 24 April 2022.

Singles main-draw entrants

Seeds 

 1 Rankings as of 11 April 2022.

Other entrants 
The following players received wildcards into the singles main draw:
  Jonáš Forejtek
  Martin Krumich
  Michael Vrbenský

The following players received entry into the singles main draw as alternates:
  Javier Barranco Cosano
  João Domingues
  Evan Furness

The following players received entry from the qualifying draw:
  Oleksii Krutykh
  Lucas Miedler
  Alejandro Moro Cañas
  Emilio Nava
  David Ionel
  Evgenii Tiurnev

The following players received entry as lucky losers:
  Tobias Kamke
  Tristan Lamasine

Champions

Singles 

  Sebastian Ofner def.  Dalibor Svrčina 6–0, 6–4.

Doubles 

  Francisco Cabral /  Szymon Walków def.  Tristan Lamasine /  Lucas Pouille 6–2, 7–6(14–12).

References

2022 ATP Challenger Tour
2022
2022 in Czech sport
April 2022 sports events in the Czech Republic